The 52nd (Lowland) Infantry Division was an infantry division of the British Army that was originally formed as the Lowland Division, in 1908 as part of the Territorial Force. It later became the 52nd (Lowland) Division in 1915. The 52nd (Lowland) Division fought in the First World War before being disbanded, with the rest of the Territorial Force, in 1920.

The Territorial Force was later reformed as the Territorial Army and the division was again raised, during the inter-war years, as the 52nd (Lowland) Infantry Division - a 1st Line Territorial Army Infantry Division - and went on to serve during the Second World War.

By December 1947, the formation amalgamated with 51st (Highland) Infantry Division to become 51st/52nd Scottish Division, but, by March 1950, 51st Division and 52nd Division had been recreated as separate formations. 52nd (Lowland) Division finally disbanded in 1968.

History

Formation
The Territorial Force (TF) was formed on 1 April 1908 following the enactment of the Territorial and Reserve Forces Act 1907 (7 Edw.7, c.9) which combined and re-organised the old Volunteer Force, the Honourable Artillery Company and the Yeomanry.  On formation, the TF contained 14 infantry divisions and 14 mounted yeomanry brigades.  One of the divisions was the Lowland Division. In peacetime, the divisional headquarters was at 7 West George Street in Glasgow.

First World War

Operations
The famous territorial regiments that were incorporated in the division were all drawn from the Scottish Lowlands, and have a history that in some cases goes back more than 300 years. It consisted of three infantry brigades, the 155th (South Scottish) Brigade, 156th (Scottish Rifles) Brigade, and 157th (Highland Light Infantry) Brigades. Initially assigned to the defence of the Scottish coast, the division moved to Gallipoli (without two of its artillery brigades), arriving there in early July 1915. While moving from Scotland the division suffered the loss of 210 officers and men killed, and another 224 injured in the Quintinshill rail crash, near Gretna, that involved the 1/7th Royal Scots.

During the First World War, the division first saw action at Gallipoli. The division began landing at the Helles front, on the Gallipoli peninsula, in June 1915 as part of VIII Corps. The 156th Brigade was landed in time to take part in the Battle of Gully Ravine, where it was mauled, under the notorious Lieutenant-General Aylmer Hunter-Weston. Advancing along Fir Tree Spur, to the right of the ravine, the brigade had little artillery support and no experience of the Gallipoli battlefield. The brigade suffered heavy casualties.

When the remaining brigades were landed, they attacked towards Krithia, along Achi Baba Nullah, on 12 July. They succeeded in capturing the Ottoman trenches, but were left unsupported and vulnerable to counter-attack. For a modest gain in ground, they suffered 30 per cent casualties and were in no fit state to exploit their position.

The division moved to Egypt as part of the Egyptian Expeditionary Force, where it manned the east-facing defensive fortifications during the Battle of Romani. On the first, and most crucial day, of the battle the division was heavily engaged with the enemy's right flank, while the Australian Light Horse, New Zealand Mounted Rifles, and 5th Mounted Brigades fought the centre and left flank in extended order. With insufficient water, the mid-summer conditions proved too much for the infantry ordered to advance the following day and were not heavily involved in the fighting thereafter. Following the battle, they advanced across the Sinai occupying Bir el Abd, El Mazar and El Arish, but remained in a supporting role.

The division fought in the First and Second Battle of Gaza in March and April 1917.

As a division of XXI Corps, it played an important part in the final overthrow of the Ottomans at the Third Battle of Gaza and the subsequent advance. The division then participated in the Battle of Jerusalem. The Battle of Jaffa saw the passage of the Nahr El Auja, on the night of 20–21 December 1917, by the division's three Brigades, which according to General Sir Edmund Allenby's despatch "reflects great credit on the 52nd (Lowland) Division. It involved considerable preparation, the details of which were thought out with care and precision. The sodden state of the ground, and, on the night of the crossing, the swollen state of the river, added to the difficulties, yet by dawn the whole of the infantry had crossed. The fact that the enemy were taken by surprise, and, that all resistance was overcome with the bayonet without a shot being fired, bears testimony to the discipline of this division. The operation, by increasing the distance between the enemy and Jaffa from three to eight miles, "rendered Jaffa and its harbour secure, and gained elbow-room for the troops covering Ludd and Ramleh and the main Jaffa-Jerusalem road."

In April 1918, the division moved to France where it fought in the Second Battle of the Somme, the Second Battle of Arras, and the Battle of the Hindenburg Line during the Hundred Days Offensive.

After the war, the division was disbanded along with the rest of the Territorial Force. However, it was re-established in 1920 as part of the Territorial Army.

Second World War

Operations

The 52nd (Lowland) Division, which had seen numerous changes in composition during the interwar period, was mobilised, along with the rest of the Territorial Army (previously the Territorial Force, reformed in 1920 and soon renamed the TA), in late August 1939, due to the worsening situation in Europe at the time. The Second World War began on 3 September 1939, after both Britain and France declared war on Germany after the latter's invasion of Poland and the 52nd, based in Scotland under the command of Major-General James S. Drew, was serving in Scottish Command, alongside its second line duplicate unit, the 15th (Scottish) Infantry Division.

The division was briefly deployed to France, following the Dunkirk evacuation, as part of the Second British Expeditionary Force (2BEF) to cover the withdrawal of Allied forces near Cherbourg during Operation Aerial. The division returned to the United Kingdom and, like most of the rest of the British Army after Dunkirk, began training to repel an expected German invasion, which never occurred. From May 1942 until June 1944, the 52nd was trained in a mountain warfare capacity, originally for a proposed invasion of Norway. However, the division was never employed in this role. Following June 1944, the 52nd Division was reorganised and trained in airlanding operations. As part of this new role, the division was transferred to the First Allied Airborne Army. By this time, the 52nd Division was under the command of Major-General Edmund Hakewill-Smith.

Several operations were planned for the division, following the successful conclusion of the Normandy Campaign. Operation Transfigure planned to have the British 1st and American 101st Airborne Divisions capture landing strips near Rambouillet, for the 52nd Division to land at. The three divisions would have then blocked the German line of retreat towards Paris. Operation Linnet proposed using most of the First Allied Airborne Army, including the 52nd Division, to seize areas in north-eastern France to block the German line of retreat. As part of Operation Market Garden, the British 1st Airborne Division was given a subsidiary mission of capturing Deelen airfield, on which the 52nd Division would land. Due to the disastrous course of events that unfolded during the Battle of Arnhem, where the 1st Airborne Division was virtually destroyed and lost almost 8,000 men, the 52nd Division was not deployed.

The division would never be used in either of the roles it had trained for, and was transferred to Belgium via sea landing in Ostend. The 157th Infantry Brigade landed first at the end of the first week of October and the rest of the division arrived over the course of the following fortnight. On 15 October, the 157th Brigade was, temporarily, attached to the 3rd Canadian Infantry Division and relieved the Canadian units in the bridgehead over the Leopold Canal. At first the Scots of 52nd Division and the Canadians did not see eye to eye, with a cultural clash of untidy and 'undisciplined' Canadians against 'spit and polish' Scots. On taking over some Canadian positions in mid-October, Scottish officers commented: "No one in Scotland would ask a pig to lie in the houses (recently vacated by the Canadians) on the south side of the canal." However, both sides soon came to recognise that high fighting capability could be engendered in both approaches.

From 23 October until December, the 52nd (Lowland) Division was assigned to the First Canadian Army, serving first under II Canadian Corps and then the British  I Corps. The division's first operation would be to aid in opening the vital Belgian port of Antwerp, in the Battle of the Scheldt. Ironically, the first operation of the division would not be in mountainous terrain or being deployed by air, but fighting below sea level on the flooded polders around the Scheldt Estuary of Belgium and the Netherlands. Operation Vitality and Operation Infatuate were aimed at capturing South Beveland and the island of Walcheren to open the mouth of the Scheldt Estuary. This would enable the Allies to use the port of Antwerp as a supply entrepôt for the troops in North-West Europe. It was in this vital operation that the 52nd Division was to fight its first battle with brilliant success that earned them high praise. During the battle, the division was given command "of all the military operations" on Walcheren. This included command of the 4th Commando Brigade, after it had landed on the island, and No. 4 Commando during the assault on Flushing. Following the battle the division would remain on Walcheren until November, when it was relieved by the 4th Canadian Armoured Division.

On 5 December, the division was transferred to XXX Corps of the British Second Army. During the month, the 157th Infantry Brigade was temporarily attached to the 43rd (Wessex) Infantry Division for several days. In January 1945, the 52nd Division, now serving under XII Corps, participated in Operation Blackcock, the clearing of the Roer Triangle between the rivers Meuse and Roer. During the operation, 19-year-old Fusilier Dennis Donnini of the 4th/5th Battalion, Royal Scots Fusiliers was posthumously awarded the Victoria Cross. During the operation, the 155th Infantry Brigade was attached to the 7th Armoured Division.

In February and March, the division was slightly reorganised with battalions being transferred amongst the division's brigades. Peter White, a second lieutenant within the 4th Battalion, King's Own Scottish Borderers, describes this change due to 21st Army Group commander Field Marshal Bernard Montgomery's "aversion to two Battalions of the same Regiment" being in the same brigade as it could result "in one home district or town having disproportionate losses after any sticky action". For most of April, the 155th Infantry Brigade was again attached to the 7th Armoured Division "to drive for the Elbe across Lüneburg Heath". The division (minus the 155th Brigade) took part in the Western Allied invasion of Germany, with its last major action being the Battle of Hamburg, where it ended the war.

Post Second World War
During 1946, the First Canadian Army was withdrawn from Germany and disbanded. As it withdrew from Germany, it "turned over its responsibilities" to the 52nd Division. After its postwar demobilisation, the TA was reformed in 1947. The division was amalgamated with the 51st (Highland) Infantry Division to form the 51st/52nd Scottish Division, while the surplus Lowland artillery regiments formed a separate 85 (Field) Army Group Royal Artillery (Lowland) in Scottish Command on 1 January 1947. In 1950, the 51st/52nd (Scottish) Division was split, restoring the independence of the 52nd Lowland Division, which took regional command of Territorial Army units based in the Scottish Lowlands, including the Territorial infantry battalions of the Lowland Brigade regiments. On 1 July 1950 85 AGRA was once more designated as HQ RA 52 (Lowland) Division. In 1967, 52nd Lowland Division was reduced to brigade strength: two brigade-level districts were established in the Highlands and Lowlands, with the Lowland District Headquarters commanded by Major General Sir Francis James Cecil Bowes-Lyon in Hamilton, near Glasgow.

General officer commanding

Orders of battle

{| class="collapsible uncollapsed" style="width:100%; background:transparent;"
|-
|+52nd Infantry Division (Cold War, incomplete)
|-
|colspan="2" |
 85 (Field) Army Group Royal Artillery (Lowland)' HQ, Townhead, Glasgow
 279 (Lowland) Field Regiment, Ayr
 280 (Lowland – City of Glasgow) Medium Regiment, Glasgow
 330 (Lowland) Medium Regiment, Troon
 357 (Lothians) Medium Regiment, Edinburgh
|}

See also

 List of British divisions in World War I
 List of British divisions in World War II
 British Army Order of Battle (September 1939)
 Independent Company

Notes
Footnotes

Citations

References/further reading

 Becke, Maj A.F. History of the Great War: Order of Battle of Divisions, Part 2a: The Territorial Force Mounted Divisions and the 1st-Line Territorial Force Divisions (42–56), London: HM Stationery Office, 1935/Uckfield: Naval & Military Press, 2007, .
 Beckett, Ian F.W. (2008) 'Territorials: A Century of Service,' published by DRA Printing of 14 Mary Seacole Road, The Millfields, Plymouth PL1 3JY on behalf of TA 100, .
 Blake, George, (1950) Mountain and Flood: the history of the 52nd (Lowland) Division, 1939–1946, Jackson & Son
 
 
 
 
 
 
 Litchfield, Norman E.H. (1992) The Territorial Artillery 1908–1988 (Their Lineage, Uniforms and Badges), Nottingham: Sherwood Press, .
 
 Perry, F.W. (1993) History of the Great War: Order of Battle of Divisions, Part 5b: Indian Army Divisions, Newport, Gwent: Ray Westlake, .
 
 
2004 reprint from Naval and Military Press published as 
 
 
 Young, Lt-Col Michael (2000) Army Service Corps 1902–1918'', Barnsley: Leo Cooper, .

External links
 Mark Conrad, The British Army, 1914 (archive site)
 The Long, Long Trail
  The order of battle for the division between 1930-1938, along with various information about the division.
  The memoirs of a Second-Lieutenant, who was a member of the 52nd (Lowland) Infantry Division.
  An article, from the Journal of the Royal United Services Institute of NSW, covering the Gallipoli campaign.
  Information on the 51st (Highland) and 52nd (Lowland) Infantry Divisions, including orders of battle and histories.
  Interactive order of battle, for the period of 1939-1945.
 The Regimental Warpath 1914–1918 (archive site)
 Graham Watson, The Territorial Army 1947
 British Army units from 1945 on

Infantry divisions of the British Army in World War I
Infantry divisions of the British Army in World War II
Military units and formations of Scotland
Military units and formations established in 1908
Military units and formations disestablished in 1961
1908 establishments in the British Empire